Nevado Paka (Quechua for eagle, Hispanicized spelling Paca) is a mountain in the Paryaqaqa mountain range in the Andes of Peru, about  high. It is situated in the Lima Region, Huarochiri Province, San Mateo District. Paka lies southwest of Wayllakancha, northwest of Pachanqutu and northeast of Tata Qayqu.

References

Mountains of Peru
Mountains of Lima Region